The 2016 Kaikōura earthquake was a magnitude 7.8 (Mw) earthquake in the South Island of New Zealand that occurred two minutes after midnight on 14 November 2016 NZDT (11:02 on 13 November UTC). Ruptures occurred on multiple faults and the earthquake has been described as the "most complex earthquake ever studied".

The complex sequence of ruptures lasted for about two minutes. The cumulative magnitude of the ruptures was 7.8, with the largest amount of that energy released far to the north of the epicentre.

Over $1.8 billion in insurance claims were received. There were two deaths, in Kaikōura and Mount Lyford.

Earthquake 

A complex sequence of ruptures with a combined magnitude of 7.8 started at 00:02:56 NZDT on 14 November 2016 and lasted approximately two minutes. The largest amount of energy released did not occur at the epicentre, rather  to the north near Seddon. Initial field surveys indicated ruptures on at least six faults, while more detailed studies confirmed ruptures on twenty-five faults. This is considered a world record for the greatest number of faults to rupture in a single earthquake event.
The earthquake was assessed as the 'most complex earthquake ever studied' and prompted the reassessment of a number of assumptions about earthquake processes.

The offshore continuation of the Kekerengu Fault to the north east, known as the Needles Fault, ruptured as well.

Cape Campbell, at the north-eastern tip of the South Island, moved to the north-northeast by more than two metres – putting it that much closer to the North Island – and rose almost one metre. Kaikōura moved to the northeast by nearly one metre, and rose seventy centimetres. The east coast of the North Island moved west by up to five centimetres, and the Wellington region moved two to six centimetres to the north. Christchurch moved two centimetres to the south.

Tsunami
The tsunami that followed the Kaikōura earthquake reached a peak height of about 7 metres. The tsunami was found to be highest at Goose Bay, with data indicating a maximum run-up height above tide level at the time of the tsunami of 6.9 m ± 0.3 m. At Oaro, the height was 5.3 m ± 0.3 m.

Immediately after the earthquake, the tide level at the Kaikōura tide gauge started dropping. Over 25 minutes, it dropped about 2.5 m, a classic warning sign of a tsunami. During the next 15 minutes, the water level rose from its lowest level by about 4 m. That was followed by a series of waves over several hours. The water level at the Kaikōura gauge rose 2.5 m higher than it would have been. This was made up of a 1.5 m rise measured on the gauge, and a rise of about 1 m of the gauge itself, as the seabed and surrounding land rose by that amount. Some other tide gauges that recorded the tsunami were in Wellington Harbour, Castlepoint, Christchurch, and the Chatham Islands.

A tsunami estimated at five metres high struck the north-facing Little Pigeon Bay on Banks Peninsula. The bay contained only one building, an unoccupied holiday house that was pushed off its foundations and heavily damaged. In neighbouring Pigeon Bay, the tsunami was observed at about 2 am but caused no damage.

Casualties and damage

Kaikōura and North Canterbury 
Two people died in the earthquake. A man was crushed and died when the historic Elms Farm homestead near Kaikōura collapsed. Two other people were rescued from the rubble of the house, including the man's 100-year-old mother. A woman died in a log house that was damaged at Mount Lyford. Early reports said her cause of death was a heart attack, but an autopsy later indicated it was a head injury suffered during the earthquake.

Most roads were cleared within 24 hours, but SH 1 between Seddon and Cheviot via Kaikōura and the Inland Kaikōura Road remained closed. The closure of SH1, the Inland Kaikōura Road and the Main North Line railway effectively cut off all land routes into Kaikōura.

As of the morning of 19 November, Kaikōura remained cut off by road due to landslides, damaged bridges and infrastructure, road subsidence, and the risk of falling debris. The NZ Transport Agency said that State Highway 1 would take months to repair, while repairs to the rail line, a key freight connection between Wellington and Christchurch, were likely to take more than a year. Parts of the diversion route via State Highways 63, 6, 65 and 7 were experiencing four times their usual traffic volume.

Mains water supply was mostly restored to Kaikōura township by 19 November, but supply was in a "fragile state" and conservation was necessary. The sewage system was "severely damaged" and unusable.

On 30 November 2016, the Inland Kaikōura Road, redesignated "Kaikōura Emergency Access Road", was reopened to civilian drivers holding a permit and for restricted times of the day. Twenty-five crews had worked to clear 50 landslips on that highway alone. It reopened unrestricted to all traffic on 19 December 2016.

State Highway 1 south of Kaikōura reopened two days later on 21 December 2016, albeit only during daylight hours. Repair of the highway north of Kaikōura took substantially longer, with the repaired highway opening over a year later on 15 December 2017. The long term closure of State Highway 1 north of Kaikōura (between Mangamaunu and Clarence) resulted in a detour through the Lewis Pass being the only major route from Picton to Christchurch. This highway had to be upgraded significantly due to this increased usage.

The section of the Main North Line rail link from Picton south to Lake Grassmere reopened on 16 January 2017. The complete railway from Picton to Christchurch was not restored until 15 September 2017, though service was limited thereafter by continued landslides and repair work; passenger service did not resume until 1 December 2018.

Ecological disturbance
Uplift along the coast at Kaikōura (up to 6 metres) exposed the intertidal zone, which resulted in a large-scale die off of many organisms including Durvillaea bull kelp. The loss of Durvillaea kelp caused ecological disturbance, significantly affecting the biodiversity of the local intertidal community. Aerial drone imaging two years after the earthquake indicated that Durvillaea abundance remained low on reefs with significant uplift, but it revealed offshore refuge populations less frequently detected by field researchers.

The Hutton's shearwater (Puffinus huttoni) colony in the Seaward Kaikōura ranges was extensively damaged by the earthquake. Large landslides buried up to 20% of the existing colony areas. Extensive shaking damaged the integrity of many burrows in the remaining shingle and soil tussock-covered habitat used by these alpine nesting seabirds. The birds were at the peak of egg laying in mid-November and with the quake happening at midnight there would have been considerable losses of birds nesting within breeding burrows.

Wellington 
In the city of Wellington, buildings were damaged, several beyond repair. Damage to docks briefly halted ferry traffic across Cook Strait; more significantly, container shipping did not resume for over ten months. The Wellington City Council was given special powers to require reports from building owners, and there were doubts about application of the rules. Several buildings were closed temporarily because of doubts about stairwells. In Lower Hutt, a cinema complex and part of the carpark in the Queensgate Shopping Centre were deemed unsafe and were demolished. At Ava railway station, one of the pedestrian access ramps was damaged and was removed during the weekend of 17 and 18 December, leaving the station without wheelchair access; the ramp was rebuilt and reopened in October 2018.

A 54-year-old nine-storey office block, the former ICI Building at 61 Molesworth Street, was demolished during December 2016 after fears that it could collapse. The damaged Reading Cinema parking building off Courtenay Place was demolished during January 2017. Both building failures resulted in part of the adjacent streets (Molesworth Street and Tory Street) being closed off for a period. The Courtenay Central Reading Cinema complex closed due to minor damage, reopened in March 2017 then closed again on 5 January 2019 after further assessment. As of March 2023 it is still standing but closed.

By February 2017, business insurance claims had passed NZ$900 million. The Wellington region had two thirds (65%) of the total losses, followed by the upper South Island at 25%, Canterbury at 8% and the remaining 2% from other North Island claims.

In 2016 and 2017 it was decided that several other buildings would be demolished, not repaired: the Figaro Block of the Malvina Major Retirement Village in Burma Road, Johnsonville, the eleven year old, seven-storey NZDF headquarters, and Statistics House at Centreport on the waterfront. Several buildings failed because of unsatisfactory design features or collapse of building services in buildings constructed only in the previous decade.

BNZ Harbour Quays, a large building on Waterloo Quay leased to the BNZ, was badly damaged in the earthquake and in 2018 the building's owner Centreport announced that it would be demolished. This building was opened in 2009 and demolished during 2019. BNZ then sued the Wellington City Council for negligence for granting building consents and issuing code compliance certificates, since concerns about the building's design had been raised by reviewing engineers before construction began. The building had previously suffered damage during the 2013 Seddon earthquake.

Wellington Central Library was not damaged during the Kaikōura earthquake but closed suddenly on 19 March 2019 after engineers reassessed it in light of new understanding about building performance gained from the 2016 quake. As of March 2023, the building has been gutted and strengthened and is expected to reopen in 2026.

Christchurch 
Several houses in the coastal suburb of New Brighton in Christchurch were looted after the occupants left because of tsunami risk.

Regional effects 
Schools and universities across the region were told to remain closed until the situation could be assessed, affecting the end-of-year NCEA examinations for secondary school students.
Exams on the day of the earthquake were cancelled in many schools, including all of Wellington. Students received derived grades for any exams due to be taken the week of the earthquake.

Response 

Prime Minister John Key surveyed the damage from the air and later described the scenes as "utter devastation" and estimated that reconstruction would take months and cost billions of dollars.

The New Zealand Defence Force dispatched five Royal New Zealand Air Force helicopters (four NH90s and one Agusta A109), a P-3 Orion and a C-130 Hercules to survey and provide essential emergency supplies to the most severely affected areas around Kaikōura. Kaikoura Aerodrome was too small to take larger multi-engine aircraft so the landing was limited to helicopters and small aircraft. The Royal New Zealand Navy's multi-role vessel  and off-shore patrol vessel  were deployed to Kaikōura to provide aid supplies and evacuate people. A United States Navy P-3 Orion of VP-47 and two Kawasaki P-1s of the Japan Maritime Self-Defense Force's Air Patrol Squadron 3, also visiting RNZAF Base Whenuapai for the RNZN 75th anniversary events, were deployed to assist.

The New Zealand Fire Service dispatched urban search and rescue teams to Wellington and Kaikōura. Paramedics were also dispatched from St John.

Nearly 200 people had been airlifted out of Kaikōura by late evening on 15 November, with about 1,000 still to be evacuated on the following morning. Stranded tourists with health issues and travel plans were put on a flight priority list. HMNZS Canterbury arrived in Kaikōura on 16 November and transported about 450 evacuees, 4 dogs, and 7 tonnes of luggage to Lyttelton, arriving early the following morning.

On the morning of 20 November, HMNZS Canterbury arrived at Lyttelton with another group of evacuees, bringing the total number evacuated from Kaikōura to more than 900.

Changes to building code 
The failure of BNZ Harbour Quays, Statistics House and other Wellington buildings that were damaged in the 2016 Kaikōura earthquake led to revision of seismic assessment guidelines. The Ministry of Business, Industry and Employment (MBIE) released The Seismic Assessment of Existing Buildings, commonly known as the Red Book, in July 2017. These guidelines provide "a technical basis for engineers to carry out seismic assessments of existing buildings". Section C5 deals with assessment of multi-storey concrete buildings. In 2018, section C5 was revised because understanding of building performance in the Kaikōura earthquake had changed. The revised section is known as the Yellow Book or Yellow Chapter. Assessment using the Yellow Book can lead to different results from assessment using the Red Book, but only the Red Book has legal standing. Wellington Central Library and Courtenay Central cinema complex were closed in 2019 after assessment under the Yellow Book guidelines. The differences in the two versions of the guidelines have led to confusion and frustration for building owners and engineers and contributed to a shortage of commercial rental properties in Wellington, as renters demand seismically safe buildings.

Aftershocks

Gallery

See also 

List of earthquakes in 2016
List of earthquakes in New Zealand
List of tsunamis affecting New Zealand
Marlborough Fault System
Kaikōura Canyon#Submarine landslides in the canyon

References

Further reading

External links 
Measuring uplift along the Kaikoura coast – GNS Science

2016 earthquakes
Kaikōura earthquake
2016 tsunamis
Earthquakes in New Zealand
History of Canterbury, New Zealand
Kaikōura
November 2016 events in New Zealand
Tsunamis in New Zealand
2016 disasters in New Zealand